Rimsting is a municipality in the district of Rosenheim in Bavaria in Germany. It lies on the shore of Lake Chiemsee between the municipalities of Prien am Chiemsee and Bad Endorf.

References

Rosenheim (district)